Rafaël Galiana (born 29 May 1960) is a French racing driver currently competing in the TCR International Series. He previously competed in the Peugeot 206 Cup.

Racing career
Galiana began his career in 1986 in karting. In 2001 he switched to the Peugeot 206 Cup, he raced there until 2004. In September 2015, it was announced that Galiana would make his TCR International Series debut with Target Competition driving a SEAT León Cup Racer.

Racing record

Complete TCR International Series results
(key) (Races in bold indicate pole position) (Races in italics indicate fastest lap)

† Driver did not finish the race, but was classified as he completed over 75% of the race distance.

References

External links
 

1960 births
Living people
French racing drivers
TCR International Series drivers